The Filmfare Critics Award for Best Film is awarded during annual Filmfare Awards, given by the Filmfare magazine. The awards are the oldest and most prominent film awards given for Hindi films in India. The yearly awards started in 1954. Movie awards were first given by popular vote. Many complained that films of artistic merit rather than commercial appeal were being overlooked, hence a new award category was added, the Best Film (Critics). The record of maximum number of wins in this category is with Mani Kaul having won four times, followed by Kumar Shahani, who won three times.

Rajnigandha, Black and Zindagi Na Milegi Dobara are the only films to win both Best Film (Critics) and Best Film.

Winner
In the list below, each individual entry shows the winning title, followed by the director of the film.

2010s

2020s

See also
 Filmfare Award for Best Film  (Popular)
 Filmfare Awards
 Bollywood
 Cinema of India

References

External links
Filmfare Critics Awards Best Film
 List of Filmfare Award Winners and Nominations, 1953–2005

F, Critics
Awards for best film